Lifetime Lab is a visitor centre located in the old Victorian waterworks along the River Lee in the city of Cork. Cork City Council undertook a restoration and conservation project, completed in 2005, to transform the industrial buildings into a new centre focused on environmental issues, science, education, and Cork's industrial heritage.

References

External links
 Lifetime Lab - official website

Buildings and structures in Cork (city)
Museums in County Cork
Tourist attractions in Cork (city)
Steam museums
Science museums in the Republic of Ireland
Education in Cork (city)